Mole National Park is Ghana's largest wildlife refuge. The park is located in the Savannah region of Ghana on savanna and riparian ecosystems at an elevation of 50 m, with a sharp escarpment forming the southern boundary of the park. The park's entrance is reached through the nearby town of Larabanga. The Levi and Mole Rivers are ephemeral rivers flowing through the park, leaving behind only drinking holes during the long dry season. This area of Ghana receives over 10 mm per year of rainfall. A long-term study has been done on Mole National Park to understand the impact of human hunters on the animals in the preserve.

History
The park's lands were set aside as a wildlife refuge in 1958. In 1971, the small human population of the area was relocated and the lands were designated a national park. The park has not seen major development as a tourist location since its original designation. The park as a protective area is underfunded and national and international concerns exist about poaching and sustainability in the park, but its protection of important resident antelope species has improved since its initial founding as a preserve.

The park is an important study area for scientists because of the removal of the human population from within the park allowing for some long-term studies, in particular, of relatively undisturbed sites compared to similar areas of densely populated equatorial West Africa. One study on the resident population of 800 elephants, for example, indicates that elephant damage to large trees varies with species. In Mole, elephants have a greater tendency to seriously injure economically important species such as Burkea africana, an important tropical hardwood, and Butyrospermum paradoxum, the source of shea butter, over the less important Terminalia spp.

Recently, honey made from flowers in the Molé National Forest has become the region's first fair-trade commodity. Nearby, villagers harvest the honey using traditional, non-invasive methods, and have partnered with a Utah-based company to sell the honey as a health and wellness supplement in the US. The program was co-founded by Ashanti Chief Nana Kwasi Agyemang, who hopes to re-ignite local interest in the honey and eventually export it to other countries in Africa.

Flora

Tree species of the park include Burkea africana, Isoberlinia doka, and Terminalia macroptera. The savanna grasses are somewhat low in diversity but known species include a spikesedge,  Kyllinga echinata, an Aneilema, Aneilema setiferum var. pallidiciliatum, and two endemic members of the Asclepiadaceae subfamily, the vine  Gongronema obscurum, and the edible geophyte, Raphionacme vignei.

Trees:

 Adansonia digitata
 Afzelia africana
 Anogeissus leiocarpus
 Afraegle paniculata
 Burkea africana
 Butyrospermum paradoxum
 Cassia sieberana
 Celastrus senegalensis
 Combretum ghasalense
 Detarium microcarpum
 Grewia lasiodiscus
 Grewia mollis
 Lannea acida
 Maytenus senegalensis
 Piliostigma thonningii
 Pterocarpus erinaceus
 Sterculia setigera
 Tamarindus indica
 Terminalia spp., including T. avicennioides
 Ximenia americana

Shrubs:
 Diospyros mespiliformis
 Feretia apodanthera
 Flueggea virosa
 Tinnsea spp.
 Urginea spp.

Herbaceous plants:
 Abutilon ramosum
 Aneilema umbrosum
 Atylosia scarabaeoides
 Blepharis maderaspatensis
 Desmodium velutinum
 Mariscus alternifolius
 Ruellia
 Sida urens
 Triumfetta pentandra
 Wissadula amplissima

Grasslands:
 Andropogon spp., including Andropogon gayanus var. squamulatus (a tall grass)
 Brachiaria spp.
 Loudetiopsis kerstingii
 Sporobolus pyramidalis (only in protected areas)
 Setaria barbata (only in protected areas)

Fauna

The park is home to over 93 mammal species, and the large mammals of the park include an elephant population, hippos, buffalo, and warthogs. The park is considered a primary African preserve for antelope species including kob, defassa waterbuck, roan, hartebeest, oribi, the bushbuck, and two duikers, the red duiker and yellow-backed duiker. Olive baboons, black-and-white colobus monkeys, the green vervet, and patas monkeys are the known species of monkeys resident in the park. Of the 33 known species of reptiles slender-snouted and dwarf crocodile are found in the park. Sightings of hyenas, lions and leopards are unusual, but these carnivores were once more common in the park. Among the 344 listed bird species are the martial eagle, the white-headed and palm-nut vultures, saddle-billed storks, herons, egrets, the Abyssinian roller, the violet turaco, various shrikes and the red-throated bee-eater.

Mole National Park, like other Ghanaian game preserves, is poorly funded for prevention of poaching. Nevertheless, the fauna of the park is guarded by professional rangers, and the poachers are at real risk to be put under arrest. Poachers tend to live within 50 km of the boundaries of the park. This distance of 50 km is the reported greatest distance hunters were willing to travel with poached game. The remnant human population of the park was removed in 1961, leaving all game hunters outside the reserve, meaning that mammal populations on the edges of the park are impacted more by hunting than interior populations.

Tourism
After improvements to the roads leading to the park, the number of visitors to the park increased from 14,600 in 2014 to 17,800 in 2015. Depending on the year, 20-40% of visitors are foreign. Farouk Umaru Dubiure, the Park Manager, says, “though we received many visitors, the funds generated were very low because 70 percent of the visitors were Ghanaian students who pay little to visit the park. These students also visit the Park on the same day and return, compared to the foreigners who spend more days to view the Park well.” 

The new road was also blamed for facilitating illegal rosewood logging bound for China.

See also
 Wildlife of Ghana
 West Africa

References

External links

National parks of Ghana
Savannah Region (Ghana)
Protected areas established in 1958
1958 establishments in Ghana